Purewa railway station was a station on the North Island Main Trunk line (NIMT) in Auckland, New Zealand. It was located between Glen Innes station and Ōrākei station.

History
The station was constructed, along with several others, in 1929 on the route of the Westfield Deviation, which was being built to divert the Auckland–Westfield section of the NIMT via a flatter, faster eastern route to link up with the original tracks at Westfield Junction. It was closed on 16 April 1947.

See also 
List of Auckland railway stations

References

Defunct railway stations in New Zealand